is a four volume shōjo manga series by .

Reception
"Four-Eyed Prince has the depth of a reader letter to Cosmo, but if that sounds like icing on the bespectacled cake, then this is going to be a sweet enough dessert for the younger female crowd." — Joseph Luster, Otaku USA
"For a first manga romance, perhaps for a young teen reader graduating up to love stories, I think this is a fine choice." — Johanna Draper Carlson, Manga Worth Reading.
"If you have a glasses fetish, there's plenty of eye-candy here for you in the body of the manga and also in the Four Eyed Café Special Report in the extras." — Sakura Eries, Mania.
"It’s an ultra light and fluffy fun volume of Four-Eyed Prince." — Rachel Bentham, activeAnime.

References

External links

Four-Eyed Prince 1 at Random House

2007 manga
Del Rey Manga
Kodansha manga
Romance anime and manga
Shōjo manga